Matt Kassian (born October 28, 1986) is a Canadian former professional ice hockey player who has played in the National Hockey League (NHL) for the Minnesota Wild and the Ottawa Senators.

Playing career
Kassian made his NHL debut during the 2010-11 season after originally being selected in the second round, 57th overall, by Minnesota in the 2005 NHL Entry Draft. His junior hockey career was spent with the Vancouver Giants of the WHL.

On November 3, 2010, the Minnesota Wild recalled Kassian from the American Hockey League's Houston Aeros. During the month of November 2010 Kassian played four games for the Wild, collecting 12 minutes in penalties and no points, with only a single shot on goal. He was then assigned back to the Aeros in December.  He was re-called from the Aeros in mid-January. He recorded his first NHL goal on March 1, 2012 in the first period of a game against the Montreal Canadiens. He scored his second NHL goal in the third period of that same game.

On March 12, 2013, Kassian was traded from the Wild to the Ottawa Senators for a sixth round draft pick in 2014. He spent the remainder of the 2012-13 season and all of the 2013-14 season with the Senators, appearing in a total of 48 games, serving primarily as an enforcer. Following the 2013-14 season, Kassian was not re-signed by Ottawa. "I wanted to be back and they felt otherwise. That's their right as an organization," he said.

In September 2014, Kassian was invited to Arizona Coyotes' training camp but was ultimately not offered a contract. He was invited to attend AHL affiliate, the Portland Pirates  training camp, and appeared in 2 games in the 2014-15 season with the club before ending his professional career and enrolling in business school.

He is of no relation to fellow professional forward Zack Kassian.

Career statistics

References

External links

1986 births
Living people
Canadian ice hockey right wingers
Houston Aeros (1994–2013) players
Ice hockey people from Edmonton
Kamloops Blazers players
Minnesota Wild draft picks
Minnesota Wild players
Portland Pirates players
Ottawa Senators players
Texas Wildcatters players
Vancouver Giants players